Prometheus Cave Natural Monument also known as Kumistavi Cave  and Tsqaltubo Cave is a karst cave located in Tsqaltubo Municipality in Imereti region of Georgia.

Morphology  
Prometheus Cave formed in Sataphlia-Tskaltubo karst massif. The total length of the cave is about 11 km, of which 1060 m are open to visitors. The cave has a total of 22 halls, six of which are currently open to tourists.

Fauna 
The inhabitants of the cave include Trachysphaera, Folsomides, Pseudachorutes, Inotrechus, Laemostenus, Bergrothia, Ceratophysella, Hypogastrura, Pseudacherontides, Sphaeridia, Folsomia, Plutomurus, Proisotoma, Campodea, Cochlicopa, Vitrinoxychilus, Physella, Codiella, Graptoppia, Oribella, Macrocheles and Xiphocaridinella.

History 
The cave was discovered and studied by Georgian speleologists (consisted of the leader Mr. Jumber Jishkariani and the members: Tamaz Kobulashvili, Amiran Jamrishvili, Vakhtang Kapanadze, Kote Nizharadze) in the early 1980s. It is part of a large cave system, united by one underground river. Currently, about 30 km of the river has been investigated, which is about half the length of the entire cave system.  
In 1985 the conversion of the cave into a sightseeing tourist destination began. By 1989, a pedestrian route was laid in the cave for about 1 kilometer, stairs and paths were built, and a 150-meter tunnel was punched out at the exit and the construction of ground-floor buildings began. The cave was equipped with temporary lighting, and small groups of tourists started to visit. 

In 1990, due to the collapse of the Soviet Union and a lack of funds, the project was closed. For several years a local citizen protected the cave from vandals, as memorialized by a statue of him and his dog at the cave's entrance.

In 2007, 17 years after the closure of the project, the Georgian authorities returned to the idea of the conversion of the cave into a tourist destination once again. President of Georgia Mikheil Saakashvili, who visited cave in 2010, gave an impetus to cave transformation into a tourist object, and suggested new name — Prometheus Cave, since the legendary antique protagonist Prometheus was chained to the mountains approximately in this area. ( Local legend makes Prometheus enchained to the bluffs of Khvamli, being perpetually tortured by a raven.)  In a year cave was refurnished and reopened to visitors on May 26, 2011.

See also 
 Bgheri Cave Natural Monument
 Didghele Cave Natural Monument
 Solkota Cave Natural Monument

References

Natural monuments of Georgia (country)
Caves of Georgia (country)
Protected areas established in 2007
Geography of Kakheti
Tourist attractions in Kakheti
2007 establishments in Georgia (country)